The Vagina Museum is the world's first bricks and mortar museum about the female reproductive system. The project is based in the United Kingdom, and moved into its first fixed location in Camden Market, London, in October 2019. Its first exhibition opened on 16 November 2019. It moved to its second premises in Bethnal Green on 19 March 2022 and was open to the public until Wednesday, February 1, 2023.

Description 
The Vagina Museum was founded in response to a lack of gynaecological representation within the culture and heritage sector throughout the world. The museum usually hosts two temporary exhibitions per year which explore a multitude of topics surrounding gynaecological health, social history, activism and discourse, as well as an events programme of talks, workshops, comedy, theatre and performance art.

History 
The project to create the Vagina Museum was launched when the founder, Florence Schechter, discovered there was a penis museum in Iceland, the Icelandic Phallological Museum, but there was no equivalent for the vagina or vulva.

2017–2018: Pop up phase 
The Museum's first event, a comedy fundraiser, was held on 19 May 2017 headlined by Hayley Ellis. It has run a number of events since, including participating in a residency with The Mothership Group called Superculture. Events as part of this residency have included a talk on "Vulvanomics" by Emma L. E. Rees, author of The Vagina: A Literary and Cultural History, and a screening of the film Teeth (see vagina dentata) followed by a Q&A with Amanda DiGioia, the author of Childbirth and Parenting in Horror Texts: The Marginalized and the Monstrous and various comedy nights. They have also held events at Limmud Festival 2017 and the Royal Institution.

The Museum held its first exhibition in August 2017 in Edinburgh, Scotland. Its second pop up exhibition was called "Is Your Vagina Normal?", and it travelled around the UK to Ancient House, Thetford, Brainchild Festival 2018, SQIFF 2018, and Museums Association Conference 2018.

In the 2017 Women of the Future Awards, Schechter was commended in the arts and culture category for her work with the Vagina Museum.

A permanent museum was proposed with exhibitions on gynaecological anatomy from science to art to culture, which was to be trans-inclusive.

2019: Crowdfunding campaign and Camden Market premises 
On 21 March 2019, the Vagina Museum launched a crowdfunder to raise money to open a premises in Camden Market.

The project was supported by Camden Council, and leader of Camden Council Georgia Gould said: 
Camden has a proud and radical history of challenging prejudice and orthodoxy, however, we acknowledge that the stigma associated with talking about gynaecological health has meant ignorance, confusion, shame, and poor medical care for too many. 65% of 16-to-25 year olds say they have a problem using the word vagina or vulva with almost half of 18-to-24 year old women say they are too embarrassed to talk about sexual health issues. We are therefore incredibly excited that the Vagina Museum is seeking to establish in Camden, and hope that it is funded to provide an inclusive and intersectional centre for learning, creativity, activism, and outreach that will add immeasurably to our collective understanding of our bodies.
The crowdfunder raised £48,945 and in October 2019, the museum moved into Camden Stables Market and began a programme of events. It opened its first exhibition, Muff Busters: vagina myths and how to fight them in November 2019.  This exhibition was scheduled to end on 29 March 2020, but closed a few days earlier due to national lockdown restrictions in the UK. The next exhibition, Periods: A Brief History  opened on 21 May 2021.

In August 2021 the museum announced that its landlord had decided not to extend its lease beyond September of that year. The Camden Market site closed but the museum retained its online presence while it sought a new premises. On 22 February 2022, it announced a relocation to 18 Victoria Park Square in Bethnal Green and a scheduled reopening date of 19 March 2022.

2022-2023: Bethnal Green premises 
On 19 March, the Vagina Museum reopened at 18 Victoria Park Square in Bethnal Green. The museum opened with its exhibition Periods: A Brief History, along with a new permanent exhibition titled From A to V. Prior to the reopening, the museum was advertised on billboards in the vicinity with cheeky puns about other local businesses in the area.

The Vagina Museum closed its Bethnal Green premises on February 2nd, 2023. As of March 2023 it is still looking for a new physical location.

See also
Culture and menstruation
Icelandic Phallological Museum
Labia pride
Vagina and vulva in art

External links 
 
 Vagina Museum on Twitter
 Vagina Museum on Instagram
 Vagina Museum on Facebook
Vagina Museum Crowdfunder

References 

2017 establishments in the United Kingdom
Vagina and vulva in art
Museums established in 2017
Sex museums
Vagina
Sexuality in the United Kingdom
Medical museums in the United Kingdom
Grade II* listed buildings in the London Borough of Tower Hamlets